HMS Arabis was a  of the Royal Navy. The ship was commissioned into the Royal Navy as HMS Arabis. She was transferred to the United States Navy in 1942, serving as USS Saucy. Returned to the United Kingdom in 1945, she was recommissioned into the Royal Navy as HMS Snapdragon.

World War II service
Arabis was built at Harland & Wolff, Belfast, as part of the 1939 War Emergency Programme for the Royal Navy. One of the early Flower-class corvettes, she was ordered on 19 September 1939, and laid down a month later. She was launched on 14 February 1940 and completed on 5 April 1940.

Royal Navy
After working up, Arabis was assigned to the Western Approaches Escort Force for service as a convoy escort. In this role Arabis was engaged in all the duties performed by escort ships; protecting convoys, searching for and attacking U-boats which attacked ships in convoy, and rescuing survivors.
During this period she fought in several convoy battles. In September 1940 Arabis was part of the force escorting convoy OB 216, which lost four ships and in October with OB 229 which lost two. The same month she was with the ill-fated HX 79 which lost twelve ships in a matter of hours.
In May 1941 Arabis was part of the force escorting HX 126, which lost seven ships sunk, and in June with HX 133 which saw six ships sunk and one U-boat destroyed.

During her two years service in the Battle of the Atlantic Arabis escorted 47 Atlantic and 11 Gibraltar convoys, assisting in the safe passage of over 2,000 ships, though some were subsequently lost.

US Navy
Whilst at Belfast in April 1942, she was transferred to the United States Navy under Reverse Lend Lease, one of ten Flower-class corvettes to be so transferred during 1942. After escorting a convoy to Halifax, Nova Scotia, she sailed to Boston for refitting. Following this she escorted ships between Trinidad and Barbados. In September she was transferred to the Trinidad-Guantanamo Bay convoy route and in January 1943 was changed again, to the Trinidad-Recife, route. She returned to North Atlantic convoy duties in March 1944 and was decommissioned from the United States Navy at Chatham, England in August 1945.

Post-war service
Recommissioned into the Royal Navy as HMS Snapdragon, she was sold in 1946.

Mercantile service
She worked as the merchant vessel SS Katina and in 1950 was renamed SS Tewfik.

Notes

References

Sources

Websites
 .

Books
 Clay Blair : Hitler’s U-Boat War Vol I  (1996) 
 
 Conway : Conway's All the World's Fighting Ships 1922–1946 (1980) 
 Elliott, Peter: Allied Escort Ships of World War II (1977) 
 Hague, Arnold : The Allied Convoy System 1939–1945 (2000)  (Canada).  (UK)

 

Flower-class corvettes of the Royal Navy
1940 ships
Temptress-class gunboats
Ships built in Belfast
Ships built by Harland and Wolff